Free Knowledge Award is an award presented by Wikimedia RU, a russian nonprofit organization dedicated to promoting encyclopedic knowledge. The prize is awarded to individuals or organizations who are not active participants in Wikimedia Foundation projects, but who have made a notable contribution to the goals of the Wikimedia movement: the dissemination of free knowledge. It has been awarded annually since 2014.

The Free Knowledge Award winners are determined in two stages. First, the wiki community nominates candidates and votes, which results in a short list. From this list, Wikimedia RU members select 3-4 winners, taking into account the arguments presented. The winners are announced directly at the ceremony.

Winners

References 

Wikimedia movement
Russian awards